Gilbert Nunns (June 30, 1907 – July 16, 2001) was a Canadian tennis player.

Born in Leeds, England, Nunns grew up in Canada and was intramural singles and doubles champion while at the University of Toronto. He won the singles title at the Ontario Championships on multiple occasions and was twice runner-up at the Canadian Championships. His career included Davis Cup appearances in 1927, 1933 and 1934, the latter as playing captain. He was Canada's top ranked player in 1930 and is a member of the Tennis Canada Hall of Fame.

Nunns was married to tennis player Beatrice Symons and they had four daughters who played collegiate tennis for the University of Toronto. One of their daughters, Brenda, was a Canadian Federation Cup player.

See also
List of Canada Davis Cup team representatives

References

External links
 
 
 

1907 births
2001 deaths
Canadian male tennis players
Tennis people from West Yorkshire
Sportspeople from Leeds
University of Toronto alumni